Yingcheng is a county-level city of about 600,000 inhabitants in Xiaogan, eastern Hubei province, People's Republic of China.

History
On December 26, 2019, a minor earthquake struck the area.

Township-level divisions
Five subdistricts:
Chengzhong Subdistrict, Chengbei Subdistrict, Silipeng Subdistrict, Dongmafang Subdistrict, Changjiangbu Subdistrict

Ten towns:
Tiandian, Yanghe, Sanhe, Langjun, Huangtan, Tian'e, Yihe, Chenhe, Yangling, Tangchi

Two other areas:
 Yingcheng Economic Area, Nanyuan Farm

Notable people
 Li Qing (born 1972), Chinese diver
 Yu Linxiang (born 1945), Chinese general
  (1884–1942), Chinese politician and diplomat
 Yang Deqing (born 1942), Chinese general
  (1902–1987), Chinese politician

Climate

References

 
Cities in Hubei
Wuhan urban agglomeration
Xiaogan